Massimo Costantini (born 28 March 1958) is an Italian table tennis player. He competed in the men's singles event at the 1988 Summer Olympics.

References

External links
 

1958 births
Living people
Italian male table tennis players
Olympic table tennis players of Italy
Table tennis players at the 1988 Summer Olympics
People from Senigallia
Sportspeople from the Province of Ancona